Držkovce is a village and municipality in Revúca District in the Banská Bystrica Region of Slovakia.

History
In historical records, the village was first mentioned in 1243 as a royal dominion (1243 Durusk, 1318  Dursk, Dersk, Deresk, 1565 Drskowecz). In 1318, it belonged to feudatories Bebek. In 1551 it had to pay tributes to Turks. In the 18th century it passed to Csáky and in the 19th century to Coburg. From 1938 to 1945, it belonged to Hungary.

Genealogical resources

The records for genealogical research are available at the state archive "Statny Archiv in Banska Bystrica, Slovakia"

 Roman Catholic church records (births/marriages/deaths): 1756-1896 (parish A)

See also
 List of municipalities and towns in Slovakia

External links
https://web.archive.org/web/20071116010355/http://www.statistics.sk/mosmis/eng/run.html
http://www.drzkovce.ocu.sk/
http://www.drzkovce.ou.sk/
Surnames of living people in Drzkovce

Villages and municipalities in Revúca District